City School is an alternative high school in Toronto, Ontario, Canada. It is located in downtown Toronto at the Waterfront Neighbourhood Community Centre at Bathurst Street and Queens Quay West.

Founded in the late 1970s, it offers classes from Grades 9 to 12 with smaller class sizes and a focus on subjects like Humanities, Mathematics, Arts, and Sciences. Total student population for 2017-2018 school year is 146.

The school is located on the third floor at 635 Queens Quay West in shared space with a preschool, elementary school and community centre, which they relocated in 1997.

References

Educational institutions established in 1979
High schools in Toronto
Education in Toronto
Schools in the TDSB
1979 establishments in Ontario